Tetradenia is a genus of plants in the family Lamiaceae, first described in 1830. It is native to Africa, including Madagascar.

Species
 Tetradenia bainesii (N.E.Br.) Phillipson & C.F.Steyn - Zimbabwe, Mozambique, Eswatini, KwaZulu-Natal
 Tetradenia barberae (N.E.Br.) Codd - Cape Province
 Tetradenia brevispicata (N.E.Br.) Codd - Zimbabwe, Namibia, Botswana, Transvaal
 Tetradenia clementiana Phillipson - Madagascar
 Tetradenia cordata Phillipson - Madagascar
 Tetradenia discolor Phillipson - Zambia, Zaire, Zimbabwe, Malawi, Tanzania
 Tetradenia falafa Phillipson - Madagascar
 Tetradenia fruticosa Benth. - Madagascar
 Tetradenia galpinii (N.E.Br.) Phillipson & C.F.Steyn - southeast Africa from Tanzania to Eswatini
 Tetradenia goudotii Briq. - Madagascar
 Tetradenia herbacea Phillipson - Madagascar
 Tetradenia hildeana Phillipson - Madagascar
 Tetradenia isaloensis Phillipson - Madagascar
 Tetradenia kaokoensis van Jaarsv. & A.E.van Wyk - Namibia
 Tetradenia multiflora (Benth.) Phillipson - Ethiopia
 Tetradenia nervosa Codd - Madagascar
 Tetradenia riparia (Hochst.) Codd - southern Africa from Angola + Malawi to Eswatini
 Tetradenia tanganyikae Phillipson - Malawi, Tanzania, Zambia
 Tetradenia tuberosa T.J.Edwards - KwaZulu-Natal
 Tetradenia urticifolia (Baker) Phillipson - eastern + central Africa from Sudan + Eritrea south to Zaire and Tanzania

References

Lamiaceae
Lamiaceae genera